The 2019 WAFF Women's Championship was an international women's football tournament held in Bahrain from 7 to 15 January 2019. The five national teams involved in the tournament were required to register a squad of 23 players, including three goalkeepers. Only players in these squads were eligible to take part in the tournament.

The age listed for each player is on 7 January 2019, the first day of the tournament. The numbers of caps and goals listed for each player do not include any matches played after the start of tournament. The club listed is the club for which the player last played a competitive match prior to the tournament. The nationality for each club reflects the national association (not the league) to which the club is affiliated. A flag is included for coaches who are of a different nationality than their own national team.

Teams

Bahrain 
Coach: Khaled Mohamed Kharban

Jordan 
Coach:  Azzedine Chih

United Arab Emirates 
Coach: Houriya Taheri

Palestine 
Coach: Raed Al Khdour

Lebanon 
Coach: Wael Gharzeddine

Notes

References 

Squads
WAFF Women's Championship squads